Subsaxibacter sediminis is a Gram-negative and rod-shaped bacterium from the genus of Subsaxibacter which has been isolated from sediments from the Midtre Lovénbreen glacier.

References

Flavobacteria
Bacteria described in 2018